Edward Paul Jones (born October 5, 1950) is an American novelist and short story writer. His 2003 novel The Known World received the Pulitzer Prize for Fiction and the International Dublin Literary Award.

Biography
Edward Paul Jones was born and raised in Washington, D.C. He was educated at Cardozo High School, the College of the Holy Cross, and the University of Virginia.

His first book, Lost in the City (1992), is a collection of short stories about the African-American working class in 20th-century Washington, D.C.  In the early stories are some who are like first-generation immigrants, as they have come to the city as part of the Great Migration from the rural South.

His second book, The Known World, was set in a fictional Virginia county and had a protagonist who was a Black planter and slaveholder.  It won the 2004 Pulitzer Prize for Fiction and the 2005 International Dublin Literary Award.

Jones's third book, All Aunt Hagar's Children, was published in 2006. Like Lost in the City, it is a collection of short stories that deal with African Americans, mostly in Washington, D.C. Several of the stories had been previously published in The New Yorker magazine. The stories in the book take up the lives of ancillary characters in Lost in the City. In 2007, it was a finalist for the PEN/Faulkner Award, which was won by Philip Roth's Everyman.

The stories of Jones' first and third book are connected. As Wyatt Mason wrote in Harper's Magazine in 2006:

The fourteen stories of All Aunt Hagar's Children revisit not merely the city of Washington but the fourteen stories of Lost in the City. Each new story—and many of them, in their completeness, feel like fully realized little novels—is connected in the same sequence, as if umbilically, to the corresponding story in the first book. Literature is, of course, littered with sequels—its Rabbits and Bechs; its Zuckermans and Kepeshes—but this is not, in the main, Jones’s idea of a reprise. Each revisitation provides a different kind of interplay between the two collections.

Neely Tucker wrote in 2009:

In the spring and fall semesters of 2009, Jones was a visiting professor of creative writing at the George Washington University. In fall 2010 he joined the English department faculty to teach creative writing.

Awards and nominations
1992: Nominated National Book Award, Lost in the City
1993: Awarded PEN/Hemingway Award, Lost in the City
1994: Awarded Lannan Literary Award for Fiction, Lost in the City
2003: Nominated National Book Award, The Known World
2003: Awarded National Book Critics Circle Award, The Known World
2004: Awarded Pulitzer Prize for Fiction, The Known World
2005: Awarded International Dublin Literary Award, The Known World
2005: Awarded MacArthur Fellowship
2007: Nominated PEN/Faulkner Award, All Aunt Hagar's Children
2010: Awarded PEN/Malamud Award for excellence in the art of the short story

Bibliography
Lost in the City (1992)
The Known World (2003)
All Aunt Hagar's Children (2006)

Notes

External links
Publisher's official page

1950 births
Living people
21st-century American novelists
20th-century American novelists
College of the Holy Cross alumni
George Washington University faculty
MacArthur Fellows
Pulitzer Prize for Fiction winners
PEN/Faulkner Award for Fiction winners
PEN/Malamud Award winners
Hemingway Foundation/PEN Award winners
University of Virginia alumni
Writers from Washington, D.C.
American male novelists
African-American short story writers
American male short story writers
20th-century American short story writers
21st-century American short story writers
African-American novelists
20th-century American male writers
21st-century American male writers
O. Henry Award winners
Members of the American Academy of Arts and Letters